Port Barnett is an unincorporated community in Jefferson County, in the U.S. state of Pennsylvania.

History
The community was named for Joseph Barnett, the original owner of the town site.

References

Unincorporated communities in Jefferson County, Pennsylvania
Unincorporated communities in Pennsylvania